Ernest Lawrence Thayer (August 14, 1863 – August 21, 1940) was an American writer and poet who wrote the poem "Casey" (or "Casey at the Bat"), which is "the single most famous baseball poem ever written" according to the Baseball Almanac, and "the nation’s best-known piece of comic verse—a ballad that began a native legend as colorful and permanent as that of Johnny Appleseed or Paul Bunyan."

Biography
Thayer was born in Lawrence, Massachusetts, and raised in nearby Worcester. He graduated magna cum laude in philosophy from Harvard University in 1885, where he had been editor of the Harvard Lampoon and a member of the theatrical society Hasty Pudding. William Randolph Hearst, a friend from both activities, hired Thayer as humor columnist for The San Francisco Examiner 1886–88.

Thayer's last piece for the Examiner, dated June 3, 1888, was a ballad entitled "Casey" ("Casey at the Bat") which made him "a prize specimen of the one-poem poet" according to American Heritage.

It was not until several months after the publication of the poem that Thayer became famous for it, since he was hardly the boastful type and had signed the June 24 poem with the nickname "Phin" which he had used since his time as a writer for the Harvard Lampoon. Two mysteries remain about the poem: whether Casey and Mudville were based on a real person or place, and, if so, their actual identities. On March 31, 2007, Katie Zezima of The New York Times wrote an article called "In 'Casey' Rhubarb, 2 Cities Cry 'Foul!'" on the competing claims of two towns to such renown: Stockton, California, and Holliston, Massachusetts.
On the possible model for Casey, Thayer dismissed the notion that any single living baseball player was an influence. However, late 1880s Boston star Mike "King" Kelly is likely as a model for Casey's baseball situations. Besides being a native of a town close to Boston, Thayer, as a San Francisco Examiner baseball reporter in the off-season of 1887–88, covered exhibition games featuring Kelly. During November 1887, some of his reportage about a Kelly at-bat has the same ring as Casey's famous at-bat in the poem. A 2004 book by Howard W. Rosenberg, Cap Anson 2: The Theatrical and Kingly Mike Kelly: U.S. Team Sport's First Media Sensation and Baseball's Original Casey at the Bat, reprints a 1905 Thayer letter to a Baltimore scribe who was asking about the poem's roots. In the letter, Thayer named Kelly (d. 1894), as having shown "impudence" in claiming to have inspired it. Rosenberg argues that if Thayer still felt offended, Thayer may have later denied Kelly as an influence. Kelly had also performed as a vaudeville actor, and recited the poem dozens of times.

The first public performance of the poem was on August 14, 1888, by actor De Wolf Hopper, on Thayer's 25th birthday. Thayer recited of the poem at a Harvard class reunion in 1895.

During the mid-1890s, Thayer contributed several other comic poems for Hearst's newspaper New York Journal and then began overseeing his family's mills in Worcester full-time. Thayer relocated to Santa Barbara in 1912, where he married Rosalind Buel Hammett and retired. He died in 1940, seven days after his 77th birthday.

The New York Times' obituary of Thayer on August 22, 1940, p. 19 quotes comedian DeWolf Hopper, who helped make the poem famous:

References

External links

Ernest Lawrence Thayer: Profile and Poem at Poets.org

1863 births
1940 deaths
American male poets
The Harvard Lampoon alumni
People from Lawrence, Massachusetts
Writers from Worcester, Massachusetts
Writers from Santa Barbara, California
San Francisco Examiner people
American male non-fiction writers
19th-century American poets
Casey at the Bat